Sama Gush Mahalleh (also Romanized as Samā Gūsh Maḩalleh; also known as Samā’ Kūsh Maḩalleh and Samā Kūsh Maḩalleh) is a village in Firuzjah Rural District, Bandpey-ye Sharqi District, Babol County, Mazandaran Province, Iran. A 2006 census reported a population of 127, with 41 families.

References 

Populated places in Babol County